La Concepción   is a corregimiento in Bugaba District, Chiriquí Province, Panama. It is the seat of Bugaba District. Its population as of 1990 was 17,978; its population as of 2000 was 19,330.

References

Corregimientos of Chiriquí Province